Kalle Randalu (born 25 November 1956) is an Estonian pianist.

Randalu was born in Tallinn, and trained at the Moscow Conservatory under Lev Vlassenko. In 1981-82 Randalu was awarded two competition prizes: he shared the VII Tchaikovsky Competition's 4th prize with Dmitri Gaiduk; and shared the VIII Schumann Competition's 3rd prize with Balázs Szokolay. He subsequently won the 1985 ARD Competition in Munich, and settled in Germany in 1988. He is a professor at the Musikhochschule Karlsruhe and an honorary doctor of the Estonian Academy of Music and Theatre.

Randalu has performed internationally. He has made recordings of chamber music by Carl Reinecke, Zdeněk Fibich, Gabriel Fauré, Charles Koechlin, André Caplet, Béla Bartók, Erwin Schulhoff, Gideon Klein, Paul Hindemith and Pēteris Vasks. In addition, he has recorded Raimo Kangro's 2nd piano concerto and Lepo Sumera's Piano Concerto.

Discography
 Jaan Rääts. Marginalia. 2014 Estonian Record Productions, ERP 5814
 Great Maestros I (with Estonian National Symphony Orchestra and Neeme Järvi). 2016 Estonian Record Productions, ERP 8916
 Great Maestros II (with Estonian National Symphony Orchestra and Neeme Järvi). 2016 Estonian Record Productions, ERP 9016

References
 Edition49
 Tchaikovsky Competition prizewinners

Estonian classical pianists
1956 births
Living people
Tallinn Music High School alumni
Academic staff of the Hochschule für Musik Karlsruhe
Musicians from Tallinn
20th-century Estonian musicians
21st-century Estonian musicians
21st-century classical pianists
Recipients of the Order of the White Star, 4th Class